The 2022 Women's South American Cricket Championship was a cricket tournament held in Itaguaí, Brazil from 13 to 16 October 2022. This was the twelfth edition of the women's South American Cricket Championship, and the third in which the matches were eligible for WT20I status since the ICC granted Twenty20 International (T20I) status to matches between all of its members.

The four participating teams this year were the national sides of hosts Brazil, along with Argentina, Peru and for the first time Canada. Brazil were the defending champions having won the event in 2019. Canada's matches did not have official T20I status in this tournament.

Tournaments for under-15s and under-19s took place earlier in October 2022, and the Men's South American Championship followed the women's event.

Squads

Warm-up matches

Round-robin

Points table

 Qualified for the final
 Qualified for the third place play-off

Fixtures

Play-offs

3rd-place play-off

Final

Notes

See also
 2022 Men's South American Cricket Championship

References

External links
 Series home at ESPNcricinfo

Associate international cricket competitions in 2022–23
Women's South American Cricket Championship
South American Cricket Championship